John Collins (1835 – April 22, 1903) was an Irish-American businessman who served as the fourth elected mayor of Seattle, Washington. 

Collins was born in County Cavan, Ireland and emigrated to the United States at age 10, settling in New York, before moving first to Maine, and then to Port Gamble, Washington to work at the Puget Sound Mill Company. Arriving in Seattle in the 1865, he successfully invested in a number of industrial concerns, including the Talbot coal mine, and the Seattle Gas Light Company, and purchased and ran the city's Occidental Hotel. By the 1880s, his business acumen had left him one of the city's wealthiest citizens. From 1869 to 1883, he served on the city council, including one year service as mayor of Seattle, in 1873. He was notable for being a "rare Catholic Democrat among the city's Protestant Republican ruling class".

In the 1890s Collins purchase the Press Times (predecessor to the Seattle Times), later selling it to new owners who, in turn, sold it to its long-time owners the Blethen family.

The Collins Building, a property commissioned by John Collins and situated on land once occupied by his personal home, is located at Second Avenue and James Street in Seattle. 

He died on April 22, 1903, after a two-year stomach disease.

References

1835 births
1903 deaths
Irish emigrants to the United States (before 1923)
People from County Cavan
Mayors of Seattle